Johannes Oesterling (also Österling; born 3 February 1983) is a German swimmer who won a bronze medal in the 4×200 m freestyle relay at the 2003 World Aquatics Championships. He finished sixth in the same event at the 2004 Summer Olympics.

References

1983 births
Living people
Swimmers at the 2004 Summer Olympics
German male freestyle swimmers
Olympic swimmers of Germany
World Aquatics Championships medalists in swimming
Sportspeople from Hanau